The Secret Millionaire was originally broadcast on Channel 4 from 29 November 2006 to June 2012.

Series

Episodes

Series 1 (2006/07)

Series 2 (2007)

Series 3 (2008)

The special episode was featured on Christmas Day 2008 was entitled "Where Are they Now?"

Series 4 (2009)

Series 5 (2009)

Series 6 (2010)

Series 7 (2010)

Changed My Life (2010/11)

Series 8 (2011)

Series 9 (2011)

Series 10 (2012)

Secret Millionaire